Several Canadian naval units have been named HMCS Winnipeg.

 (I) was an  that served in the Royal Canadian Navy. HMCS Winnipeg served from its commission in March 1943 to November 1946.
 (II) is a  serving in the Canadian Forces Maritime Command since 1996.

Battle honours
Atlantic, 1943–45
Arabian Sea

References

Directory of History and Heritage - HMCS Winnipeg 

Royal Canadian Navy ship names